Juozas Tūbelis (9 April 1882 in Ilgalaukis, Kovno Governorate – 30 September 1939, Kaunas) was a Lithuanian politician, Prime Minister and member and chairman of the Lithuanian Nationalists Union.

In 1908, he graduated from Polytechnical Institute in Riga receiving a diploma in agronomy. Not being able to find employment in his field, for another two years he worked in Riga as a teacher and then on land exploitation projects. In 1915, he was drafted to the Russian army. He was able to assist the Lithuanian Society for the Relief of War Sufferers which helped out refugees and others suffering from war. He traveled across Russia and in 1918 he returned to Lithuania, and worked for the Council of Lithuania at an education commission.

On 11 November 1918, Tūbelis became Minister of Agriculture and State Treasures. On 12 March 1919 he had to resign from the post but became Minister of Education till 19 June 1920. From September 1929 he was Minister of Finance. He held this position until 24 March 1938. On 23 September 1929 he became the Prime Minister of Lithuania. He led three Minister Cabinets (the 14th, 15th and 16th) before resigning on 24 March 1938. Tūbelis was the longest standing Prime Minister of Lithuania. From March 1938 until 5 December 1938 he was Minister of Agriculture. He was also the Governor of the Bank of Lithuania in 1939.

Between political roles, Tūbelis helped to establish and direct large enterprises like Lietūkis (est. in 1923), Maistas (est. in 1925), and Pienocentras (est. in 1926).

After the coup d'état in 1926, his brother-in-law Antanas Smetona became the president. Since the two men agreed on political views, Tūbelis became the second most powerful man in Lithuania in the 1930s. He is credited for stable economy, national currency litas, and small foreign debt despite the Great Depression.

He was married to Jadvyga Tūbelienė.

References 

 Juozas Tūbelis, Previous Governments: Between 1918 and 1940, Government of the Republic of Lithuania. Accessed September 7, 2006.

1882 births
1939 deaths
People from Rokiškis District Municipality
People from Kovno Governorate
Party of National Progress politicians
Lithuanian Nationalist Union politicians
Prime Ministers of Lithuania
Ministers of Agriculture of Lithuania
Ministers of Education of Lithuania
Ministers of Finance of Lithuania
Chairmen of the Bank of Lithuania
Lithuanian agronomists
Russian military personnel of World War I
Riga Technical University alumni